Uşak is a province in western Turkey. Its adjacent provinces are Manisa to the west, Denizli to the south, Afyon to the east, and Kütahya to the north. The provincial capital is Uşak, and its licence location code is 64. The province covers an area of 5,341 km2.

In August 2018, the province decided to stop running digital advertisement on United States based social media platforms like Facebook, Google, Instagram, Twitter and YouTube canceling all of the budget as a response to the U.S. sanctions on Turkey. The U.S. sanctions were over the detention of the Pastor Andrew Brunson.

Districts 

Uşak province is divided into 6 districts (capital district in bold):
 Banaz
 Eşme
 Karahallı
 Sivaslı
 Ulubey
 Uşak

Gallery

References

External links 

  Uşak governor's official website
  Uşak municipality's official website
  Uşak weather forecast information 
 News from Uşak province and 6 districts